The 1820 United States elections elected the members of the 17th United States Congress. The election took place during Era of Good Feelings and the First Party System. Despite the Panic of 1819, the Democratic-Republican Party maintained control of the presidency and both houses of Congress, while the Federalist Party provided only limited opposition. Missouri joined the union during the 17th Congress.

In the presidential election, incumbent Democratic-Republican President James Monroe received no major opposition, although fellow Democratic-Republican John Quincy Adams received one electoral vote. The Federalists did not nominate a presidential candidate, although four Federalists received a scattering of electoral votes for vice president. Monroe joined George Washington as the only presidential candidates who won election without any serious opposition.

In the House, Federalists picked up a small number of seats, but Democratic-Republicans continued to dominate the chamber.

In the Senate, Democratic-Republicans picked up a moderate number of seats, increasing their already-dominant majority.

See also
1820 United States presidential election
1820–21 United States House of Representatives elections
1820–21 United States Senate elections

References

1820 elections in the United States
1820